Oleg Zhukov (born 9 February 1976) is a Russian former road cyclist.

Major results

1998
 1st  Time trial, European Under-23 Road Championships
 1st  Time trial, National Road Championships
2000
 2nd Time trial, National Road Championships
2001
 5th Tour du Finistère
2003
 1st Overall Course Cycliste de Solidarnosc et des Champions Olympiques
 National Road Championships
3rd Road race
4th Time trial
 3rd Overall Tour de Serbie
1st Stage 1
 5th Overall Tour de Normandie
2004
 2nd Time trial, National Road Championships
 2nd Clásica Internacional Txuma
 10th Overall Course Cycliste de Solidarnosc et des Champions Olympiques
 10th Overall Volta a Tarragona

References

External links

1976 births
Living people
Russian male cyclists